Mastogloia is a genus of diatoms belonging to the family Mastogloiaceae.

The genus has cosmopolitan distribution.

Species

Species:

Mastogloia abnormis 
Mastogloia achnanthioides 
Mastogloia acuta

References

Bacillariophyceae
Diatom genera